Mysore Venkatesha Doreswamy Iyengar (1920-1997) was a Carnatic musician and one of the greatest exponents of the veena in modern Indian history.

Early life 

He was a son of Venkatesha Iyengar, a learned vainika and royal musician at the court of the Princely State of Mysore.
Iyengar started learning the veena from his father at an early age and soon became a disciple of Veena Venkatagiriyappa. He performed in the presence of the then Maharaja of Mysore at the age of 12. Spellbound, the Maharaja presented him with a fifty-rupee silver coin. Iyengar received a BA degree from Maharaja's College, Mysore.

Career 

He gave his first public performance in 1943 at the Bangalore Gayana Samaja. He participated in music conferences including one in Shiraz, Iran, in 1969, where he was also invited to perform at the Shiraz Persepolis Festival of Arts..

He served as the Music Director at the All India Radio in Bangalore. The University of Mysore conferred upon him an Honorary Doctorate in 1975.

In an age when most of the other vainikas had started using the contact microphone, Iyengar stuck to the ‘acoustic’ Veena. His style of playing is sometimes referred to as the Mysore Style. This distinctive style is marked by the movements from one note to another being achieved with the playing fingers (the index and middle fingers of the left hand) parted. This, along with his prolonged, medieval string plucking style enabled him to achieve the continuity of sound.

Concerts of Iyengar, accompanied by Mysore T Chowdiah on the violin, became very popular. He participated in many Jugalbandis, including with famous Hindustani classical instrumentalists such as Ustad Ali Akbar Khan. He composed music for dance dramas, notably to those of P. T. Narasimhachar. Iyengar also composed songs for a few Kannada films, notably Subbashastri, starring Kalyan Kumar. Iyengar was regularly accompanied on mridangam by V S Rajagopal. The noted vainika C. Krishnamurthy was one of Iyengar's main disciples.

Iyengar died aged 77 in Bangalore, India.

Awards 

Doreswamy Iyengar was awarded the Padma Bhushan by the President of India in 1983, the Sangeetha Kalanidhi of the Madras Music Academy in 1984, the Sangeetha Kalasikhamani of the Indian Fine Arts Society in 1994, the Sangeetha Kalarathna of the Bangalore Gayanasamaja, and the Chowdiah National Memorial Award.

References

External links 
  Listen to Tyagaraja Compositions performed by Sri Doreswamy Iyengar
  his compositions in mp3 format

1920 births
1997 deaths
Saraswati veena players
Male Carnatic singers
Carnatic singers
Musicians from Mysore
University of Mysore alumni
Maharaja's College, Mysore alumni
All India Radio people
20th-century Indian male classical singers
Recipients of the Padma Bhushan in arts
Recipients of the Sangeet Natak Akademi Award